Lepperton is a small village in  North Taranaki, New Zealand.

Demographics
Lepperton is part of the larger Lepperton-Brixton statistical area.

Lepperton had a population of 405 at the 2018 New Zealand census, an increase of 81 people (25.0%) since the 2013 census, and an increase of 105 people (35.0%) since the 2006 census. There were 135 households, comprising 201 males and 201 females, giving a sex ratio of 1.0 males per female, with 114 people (28.1%) aged under 15 years, 51 (12.6%) aged 15 to 29, 195 (48.1%) aged 30 to 64, and 45 (11.1%) aged 65 or older.

Ethnicities were 91.1% European/Pākehā, 15.6% Māori, 2.2% Pacific peoples, 3.7% Asian, and 1.5% other ethnicities. People may identify with more than one ethnicity.

Although some people chose not to answer the census's question about religious affiliation, 58.5% had no religion, 29.6% were Christian, 0.7% were Buddhist and 0.7% had other religions.

Of those at least 15 years old, 42 (14.4%) people had a bachelor's or higher degree, and 54 (18.6%) people had no formal qualifications. 60 people (20.6%) earned over $70,000 compared to 17.2% nationally. The employment status of those at least 15 was that 177 (60.8%) people were employed full-time, 54 (18.6%) were part-time, and 0 (0.0%) were unemployed.

Lepperton-Brixton

Lepperton-Brixton had a population of 1,725 at the 2018 New Zealand census, an increase of 201 people (13.2%) since the 2013 census, and an increase of 429 people (33.1%) since the 2006 census. There were 615 households, comprising 879 males and 846 females, giving a sex ratio of 1.04 males per female. The median age was 40.8 years (compared with 37.4 years nationally), with 402 people (23.3%) aged under 15 years, 216 (12.5%) aged 15 to 29, 870 (50.4%) aged 30 to 64, and 237 (13.7%) aged 65 or older.

Ethnicities were 89.6% European/Pākehā, 17.9% Māori, 1.6% Pacific peoples, 2.8% Asian, and 2.6% other ethnicities. People may identify with more than one ethnicity.

The percentage of people born overseas was 9.9, compared with 27.1% nationally.

Although some people chose not to answer the census's question about religious affiliation, 53.6% had no religion, 35.7% were Christian, 0.2% had Māori religious beliefs, 0.7% were Muslim, 0.3% were Buddhist and 0.9% had other religions.

Of those at least 15 years old, 165 (12.5%) people had a bachelor's or higher degree, and 303 (22.9%) people had no formal qualifications. The median income was $35,600, compared with $31,800 nationally. 261 people (19.7%) earned over $70,000 compared to 17.2% nationally. The employment status of those at least 15 was that 729 (55.1%) people were employed full-time, 243 (18.4%) were part-time, and 42 (3.2%) were unemployed.

Kairoa Pa

Near Lepperton is Kairoa Pa, an historic centre for local Maori settlement. It is also an entry point for the Whakaahurangi track to Ketemarae Pa near Normanby. This track linked northern and southern Taranaki before British settlement.

Climate

Education
Lepperton School is a coeducational contributing primary (years 1-6) school with a roll of  students as of  The school was founded in 1870.

References

Further reading

General historical works
Even the Dogs Have Forgotten to Bark A 284 A4 page fully indexed comprehensive history of Lepperton, Sentry Hill and Waiongana. Author PT Wilson published 2012   Available in most Taranaki libraries.

A second edition of "Even the Dogs Have Forgotten to Bark" was published in 2020. Largely a reprint but some important updates have been made. (ISBN 978-0-473-50951-4) A few copies of the book are still available. This edition is also available in most Taranaki libraries. Authors website is https://wisdomisashelter.co.nz

Business history

See

Churches

Anglican

Maps

   Scale: 1: 4 752 (i.e. 1/13.3 in. to the mile) 
   Scale: 1: 20 000 (i.e. 1/3.17 in. to the mile) NZMS 43
   Scale: 1: 25 000 (i.e. 1/2.53 in. to the mile) NZMS 2 ; N109/1 & N99/7
   Scale: 1: 20 000 (i.e. 1/3.17 in. to the mile)

Railways

Schools

External links
Statistics NZ: Lepperton Community Profile
Map of Lepperton census ward
Lepperton School website
 Radio New Zealand National programme, Afternoons with Jim Mora, Thursday 20 September 2012 ''Your Place- Lepperton Play or download options

Populated places in Taranaki
New Plymouth District